Caladenia atradenia, commonly known as bronze fingers, is a plant in the orchid family Orchidaceae and is endemic to New Zealand. It is a ground orchid with a thin, hairy leaf and a thin wiry stem bearing one or two dark green or greenish red flowers with maroon or magenta markings.

Description
Caladenia atradenia is a terrestrial, perennial, deciduous, herb, sometimes solitary or in groups of up to ten individuals.

The flowers are dark to reddish-green, often with dark magenta markings. The dorsal sepal curves forward, forming a hood over the column. There are between four and eight pair of dark, purplish linear calli, decreasing in size towards the front along the sides of the labellum and two rows of white-stalked, dark headed calli on the mid-lobe.

Taxonomy and naming
Caladenia atradenia was first formally described by David Jones, Brian Molloy and Mark Clements and the description was published in The Orchadian. The specific epithet (atradenia) is from the Latin word ater meaning "black" and the ancient Greek word aden meaning "gland" referring to the blackish labellum calli.

Distribution and habitat
Bronze fingers grows in poor soils, usually in thick leaf litter under shrubs in mixed conifer/broadleaved-hardwood forest but also on bare ground and in exotic pine plantations. It is found on both the North and South Islands of New Zealand.

References

atradenia
Plants described in 1997
Orchids of New Zealand
Taxa named by David L. Jones (botanist)
Taxa named by Mark Alwin Clements
Taxa named by Brian Molloy (botanist)